Cyril Joseph Settle Dodd (1844 - 29 January 1913) was a British Liberal Party politician who served as Member of Parliament for Maldon in Essex in the 25th Parliament between 1892 and 1895.

Dodd was first elected at the 1892 general election.

References

External links 
 Cyril Dodd on Hansard

1844 births
1913 deaths
Liberal Party (UK) MPs for English constituencies
UK MPs 1892–1895
People from Maldon, Essex